The Wisconsin State League was a class D baseball league that began in 1905, changing its name to the Wisconsin–Illinois League in 1908 and operating through 1914. The league re–organized under that name in 1926. Another Wisconsin State League began in 1940, shut down during World War II from 1943 through 1945, then operated from 1946 through 1953.

The Class D Wisconsin–Illinois League began play in 1940 with six charter franchises: Appleton Papermakers, Fond du Lac Panthers, Green Bay Bluejays, La Crosse Blackhawks, Sheboygan Indians and Wisconsin Rapids White Sox. In 1942 the league expanded to eight teams, adding the Janesville Cubs and Oshkosh Giants. After play resumed in 1946, La Crosse moved to become the Wausau Lumberjacks and the league operated with those franchises until its demise following the 1953 season.

List of teams

Wisconsin State League (1905–1907, 1922–1925, 1928–1931, 1940–1942, 1946–1953)Wisconsin–Illinois League (1908–1914, 1926–1927, 1932)
Appleton, WI: Appleton Papermakers (1891, 1909–1914, 1940–1942, 1946–1953)
Beloit, WI: Beloit Collegians (1905); Beloit Fairies (1926–1927) 
Chicago, IL: Logan Squares (1926–1927, 1932); Niesen's Chicago Pyotts (1926); St. Michael's (1926); Duffy Florals (1932); Harley Mills (1932)
Eau Claire, WI: Eau Claire-Chippewa Falls Orphans (1906); Eau Claire Tigers (1907)
Fond du Lac, WI: Fond du Lac (1891); Fond du Lac Webfoots (1907); Fond du Lac Cubs (1908); Fond du Lac Giants (1909–1910); Fond du Lac Molls (1913); Fond du Lac Mudhens (1911); Fond du Lac Panthers (1940–1942, 1946–1953)
Freeport, IL: Freeport Pretzels (1905–1909)
Green Bay, WI: Green Bay Bays (1891); Green Bay Colts (1905–1906); Green Bay Orphans (1907); Green Bay Tigers (1908); Green Bay Bays (1909–1914); Green Bay Blue Sox (1941); Green Bay Bluejays (1940, 1942, 1946–1953)
Janesville, WI: Janesville Cubs (1941–1942, 1947–1953); Janesville Bears (1946)
Kenosha, WI: Kenosha Twin Sixes (1926–1929)
La Crosse, WI: La Crosse Pinks (1905–1906, 1908); La Crosse Badgers (1907); La Crosse Boosters (1926); La Crosse Blackhawks (1940–1942)
Madison, WI: Madison Senators (1905–1914); Madison Blues (1928–1932)
Manitowoc, WI: Manitowoc Shipbuilders (1928–1931)
Marinette, WI: Marinette Badgers (1891); Marinette-Menominee Twins (1914)
Milwaukee, WI: Milwaukee Creams (1913); Kosciuszko Reds (1928–1930);Onion Oils/Union Oils (1928); Milwaukee Red Sox (1931–1932)
Oconto, WI: Oconto (1891)
Oshkosh, WI: Oshkosh Indians (1905–1914); Oshkosh Giants 1941–1942, 1946–1953)
Racine, WI: Racine Malted Milks (1909–1911, 1914); Racine Belles (1909–1915); Racine Eskimos (1926); Racine Belles (1929–1930)
Rockford, IL: Rockford Reds (1908–1910); Rockford Wolverines (1911–1913); Rockford Wolves (1914)
Sheboygan, WI: Sheboygan Chairmakers (1926–1932); Sheboygan Indians (1940–1942, 1946–1953)
Two Rivers, WI: Two Rivers Mirrors (1928–1931)
Wausau, WI: Wausau Lumberjacks (1905–1908, 1912–1914, 1946–1953)
Wisconsin Rapids, WI: Wisconsin Rapids White Sox (1940–1942, 1946–1953)

Season standings

1891 to 1892
1891 Wisconsin State League

1905 Wisconsin State League

1906 Wisconsin State League
schedule
 La Crosse played Freeport on the last day of the season with the pennant in balance. 5,000 fans saw a 0-0 game after nine innings. La Crosse pushed across five runs in the tenth to win.

1907 to 1914
1907 Wisconsin State League 
schedule

1908 season (W-I League)V1909 season (W-I League)1910 season (W-I League) 1911 season (W-I League) 1912 season (W-I League) 1913 season (W-I League) 1914 season (W-I League) 

1922 to 19371922 season (Wis. State League) 1923 season (Wis. State League) 1924 season (Wis. State League) 1925 season (Wis. State League)1926 season (W-I League)1927 season (W-I League) 1928 season (Wis. State League) 1929 season (Wis. State League) 1930 season (Wis. State League) 1931 season (Wis. State League) 1932 season (W-I League) 1933 season (W-I League) 1934 season (Wis. State League)|+First half of the split season:|+Second half of the split season:The Madison Blues won the tie-breaker from Wisconsin Rapids to meet Green Bay, the winner of the season's first half. Green Bay prevailed in the final three-game championship series.1935 season (Wis. State League)|+First half of the split season:After tying for title of the season's first half, Madison won the first two of a three-game championship series over Sheboygan.

|+Second half of the split season:Sheboygan won the run-off for title of the season's second half, but were defeated by first half champs Madison after the Blues won the first two of the three-game title series.1936 season (Wis. State League)|+First half of the split season:Madison defeated Racine to win the title of the season's first half.

|+Second half of the split season:Madison clinched the title of the season's latter half on Aug. 23 when they defeated the Racine Belles. The Blues became 1936 State League champions by winning both halves of the split season.1937 season (Wis. State League)|+First half of the split season:Madison defeated Sheboygan in a three-game series to win the title of the season's first half.

|+Second half of the split season:'''

Sheboygan won the three-game tie-breaker series against Madison to win title of the season's latter half. Facing Sheboygan again for the 1937 championship, Blues manager Eddie Lenahan insisted on a single deciding game instead of three. The State League disagreed, declaring that Madison had forfeited the season by refusing to play in a three-game series. The Chairmakers were awarded the 1937 season championship.

References

Baseball leagues in Wisconsin
1940 establishments in Wisconsin
1953 disestablishments in Wisconsin
Defunct minor baseball leagues in the United States
Wisconsin State League teams